Climate Policy is an interdisciplinary peer-reviewed scientific journal publishing research and analysis on all aspects of climate change policy, including both mitigation and adaptation. It was launched in 2000 and is published ten times per year by Taylor & Francis. The current Editor is Jan Corfee-Morlot, Editors-in-Chief are Frank Jotzo (Australian National University) and Harald Winkler (University of Cape Town).  According to the Journal Citation Reports, the journal has a 2018 two-year impact factor of 4.797 and a five-year impact factor of 4.073.  It is ranked 1st out of 47 in the Public Administration ranking and 15th out of 116 in Environmental Studies. The journal works closely with its Associate Editors and Editorial Board, whose international membership reflects a wide range of expertise in climate policy-making and implementation. Climate Policy is published in partnership with Climate Strategies, with which it shares a blog.

Background 
Climate Policy was founded in 2000 by Michael Grubb (now Professor of Climate Change and Energy Policy, University College London), who saw a gap in academic publishing on the emerging issue of climate change.  Journals existed on the science of climate change, but none focussed on the national and international policy dimensions. The scientific evidence for climate change was becoming clearer, including through the reports of the Intergovernmental Panel on Climate Change (IPCC), and governments had declared their commitment to address the problem by adopting the UN Framework Convention on Climate Change (UNFCCC) in 1992 and the Kyoto Protocol in 1997.  New research was urgently needed on policy tools and approaches that could start to move the world onto a lower-carbon and more climate-resilient path.  The vision of Climate Policy was to encourage such policy-relevant research, and make it accessible to anyone involved in tackling climate change. The first issue of Climate Policy, initially published by Elsevier, was released in November 2000, immediately before the sixth Conference of the Parties (COP 6) to the UNFCCC. The first full volume was published in 2001, with four issues.  Michael Grubb served as Editor-in-Chief up to 2016.  The first Editor was Richard Lorch (to 2013), followed by Peter Mallaburn (2014-2016) and  Joanna Depledge (2017-2020).

Aims and scope 
Climate Policy's central aim is to help inform the response to climate change by publishing rigorous, evidence-based research and analysis that is accessible and relevant, not only to academics, but also to policymakers and practitioners from all sectors. It provides a platform for new ideas, innovative approaches and research-based insights that can help advance climate policy in practice.  As an interdisciplinary, policy-focussed journal, Climate Policy actively encourages submissions from all relevant academic fields. 

As part of its international and interdisciplinary scope, Climate Policy publishes papers on the full range of sectors implicated in climate change, and on the many policy options and governance approaches that are being implemented or proposed around the world.  Of particular interest are evaluations of existing policy instruments and approaches, as well as analyses of innovative proposals and emerging issues that are new to the literature or the empirical arena.

Contents 
Climate Policy publishes the following article types:

 Research articles (around 7,000 words), presenting the results of primary research.
 Synthesis articles (around 8,000 words), providing an original synthesis of existing knowledge and research on a particular topic. 
 Policy analyses (around 5,000 words), evaluating existing policy approaches or instruments, or analysing new policy proposals.
 Outlook articles (around 3,000 words), contributing evidence-based and rigorous original commentary on issues of key contemporary interest.

In addition to its 10 issues a year, Climate Policy publishes occasional special issues and supplements focussed on major emerging issues, and guest edited by experts in the field.  Recent special issues and supplements have included the following:

 Climate change policies, natural resources and conflict: Implications for development (Guest edited by Esteve Corbera, Courtney Work and Dik Roth)
 National-level Carbon Emissions Trading in China: Challenges and Prospects (Guest edited by Maosheng Duan, Shaozhou Qi and Libo Wu)
 Policy Instruments for Limiting Global Temperature Rise to 1.5°C (Guest edited by Fu Sha, Axel Michaelowa and Myles Allen)
 EU Climate Policy: Effectiveness, Efficiency and Feasibility to 2050 (Guest edited by Paul Ekins, Paul Drummond and Benjamin Görlach)

References

External links

Blog
Twitter feed

Climatology journals
Publications established in 2001
Taylor & Francis academic journals
Policy analysis journals
English-language journals
Climate change policy